Volleyball at the 1987 All-Africa Games was held in Nairobi, Kenya for both genders men and women.

Events

Medal table

Medal summary

Medal table

References

External links
Men's Competitions
Women's Competitions

Volleyball at the African Games
A
1987 All-Africa Games
International volleyball competitions hosted by Kenya